107.1 Radyo Natin (DWJS 107.1 MHz) is an FM station owned and operated by Manila Broadcasting Company. Its studios and transmitter are located at 4th Floor, Catanduanes College Bldg., Brgy. Salvacion, Virac, Catanduanes.

References

External links
Radyo Natin Virac FB Page

Radio stations in Catanduanes
Radio stations established in 1997